Topľa is a river in eastern Slovakia and right tributary of the Ondava. It rises in the Čergov mountains, flows through Ondava Highlands, Beskidian Piedmont, Eastern Slovak Hills and Eastern Slovak Flat and flows into the Ondava in the cadastral area of Parchovany. It flows through the towns of Bardejov, Giraltovce, Hanušovce nad Topľou and Vranov nad Topľou.

Etymology
The name come from Slavic (Slovak) Teplá: warm (river). The name was adopted by Hungarians and then it was adopted back (in the modified form) by Slovaks, probably in the 13th century.

References

Rivers of Slovakia